Horst Beyer is a Paralympian athlete from Germany competing mainly in category P42 pentathlon events.

Biography
He competed for West Germany in the 1988 Summer Paralympics in Seoul, South Korea.  There he finished sixth in the men's Discus throw - A2A9 event, finished fifth in the men's Javelin throw - A2A9 event and finished sixth in the men's Shot put - A2A9 event.  Following reunification he competed for Germany in the 1992 Summer Paralympics in Barcelona, Spain.  There he won a gold medal in the men's Discus throw - THS2 event and finished fourth in the men's Pentathlon - PS3 event.  He also competed at the 1996 Summer Paralympics in Atlanta, United States.    There he won a gold medal in the men's Pentathlon - P42 event, a silver medal in the men's Discus throw - F42 event and a bronze medal in the men's Shot put - F42 event.  He also competed at the 2000 Summer Paralympics in Sydney, Australia.    There he won a bronze medal in the men's Pentathlon - P42 event, finished sixth in the men's Discus throw - F42 event and finished seventh in the men's Shot put - F42 event

External links
 

Paralympic athletes of Germany
Paralympic athletes of West Germany
Athletes (track and field) at the 1988 Summer Paralympics
Athletes (track and field) at the 1992 Summer Paralympics
Athletes (track and field) at the 1996 Summer Paralympics
Athletes (track and field) at the 2000 Summer Paralympics
Paralympic gold medalists for Germany
Paralympic silver medalists for Germany
Paralympic bronze medalists for Germany
Living people
Medalists at the 1992 Summer Paralympics
Medalists at the 1996 Summer Paralympics
Medalists at the 2000 Summer Paralympics
Year of birth missing (living people)
Paralympic medalists in athletics (track and field)
German male discus throwers
German male shot putters
German pentathletes
Discus throwers with limb difference
Shot putters with limb difference
Paralympic discus throwers
Paralympic shot putters